Greedy Lying Bastards is a 2012 American documentary film directed by Craig Rosebraugh. The film explores the phenomenon of climate change denial.

Content
Greedy Lying Bastards investigates the climate change misinformation campaign waged by the petroleum industry and its funded think tanks. The film exposes how a small number of well-paid spokespeople have worked to confuse the public and lawmakers on the issue. Both ExxonMobil and Koch Industries are identified in the film as two of the worst culprits funding the denial campaign. In addition to exposing the denial campaign, Greedy Lying Bastards tells the stories of those currently impacted by changing climate. These include residents of Kivalina, Alaska who are faced with relocation due to erosion of shorelines caused from rising temperatures and those in Tuvalu facing sea level rise. "The film also covers the 2012 Colorado wildfires, drought in Kansas [part of the wider 2010–13 Southern United States and Mexico drought] and Hurricane Sandy."

Production
Greedy Lying Bastards was directed, produced and narrated by Craig Rosebraugh. He co-wrote the film with two-time Emmy Award winning editor Patrick Gambuti, Jr., who also served as editor. Daryl Hannah was an executive producer and Michael Brook, who wrote the score for An Inconvenient Truth, was the composer.

In making the film Rosebraugh sought to "undertake a project that would uncover the hidden agenda of the oil industry and provide answers as to why we as a nation fail to implement clean energy policies and take effective action on important problems such as climate change."

The film began production in 2009 and finished late in 2012.

Release
Greedy Lying Bastards was released theatrically in North America on March 8, 2013, where it grossed $45,000.  Disinformation released it on home video January 14, 2014, and it grossed another $73,537 in North American sales.

Reception
Rotten Tomatoes, a review aggregator, reports that 69% of 35 surveyed critics gave the film a positive review; the average rating is 6.2/10.  The site's consensus reads: "It's not particularly subtle, but Greedy Lying Bastards is effective in questioning the motives of climate change deniers."  Metacritic rated it 56/100 based on 14 reviews.

Awards
 2012 Burbank Film Festival Best Documentary Feature
 2012 Boston Film Festival Eco Award

Other festivals
 2013 Reykjavik International Film Festival, Official Selection
 2013 Beijing International Film Festival, Official Selection
 2013 Environmental Film Festival (Washington D.C.), Official Selection
 2012 United Nations Association Film Festival, Official Selection
 2012 Bahamas International Film Festival, Official Selection
 2012 Costa Rica International Film Festival

References

External links
 
 
 
 
 

2012 films
2012 documentary films
American documentary films
Documentary films about business
Documentary films about global warming
Films scored by Michael Brook
Films set in 2012
Films set in Alaska
Films set in Colorado
Films set in Kansas
Films set in Tuvalu
Hurricane Sandy
Petroleum industry
2010s English-language films
2010s American films